The Insein General Hospital is a 500-bed public hospital and teaching hospital located in northern part of Yangon, with 9 in-patient wards and 6 specialty clinics.

History
In 1930, a well-known wealthy man in British rule, Sir Pho Thar, built and donated a 50-bed station hospital as an ancient colonial style building. Thus, it was known as Sir Pho Thar Hospital at that time. It was upgraded to 100-bed general hospital in 1952, 150-bed with specialty units for dentistry, orthopedics, laboratory and radiology in 1965 and 300-bed in 1991. With all these development, it became a central level government hospital in July 1995.

In 1996, a new 3-storey building and a guard ward for imprisoned patients with 20 beds were developed. Prisoners from Insein Prison are admitted in this guard ward as the prison is located nearby the hospital.

Wards
 General Medical Ward
 General Surgical Ward
 Obstetrics & Gynecological Ward
 Pediatric Ward
 Trauma & Orthopedic Ward
 Ophthalmological Ward
 Otorhinolaryngological Ward
 Intensive Care Unit
 Sanga Ward for Buddhist Monks
 Guard Ward for Imprisoned Patients
 Oncology Ward

Specialty clinics
 Elderly Clinic
 Dentistry Clinic
 Physical Medicine
 Psychiatric Clinic
 Tuberculosis Clinic
 ART Clinic
 Dermatology clinic
 Sexually Transmitted Disease Clinic
 Medical Oncology Clinic

Diagnostic departments
 Radiology Department
 Pathology Department
 Microbiology Department

Auxiliary departments
 Medical Record Department
 Medical Store Department
 Kitchen
 Laundry
 Motor Transport

Teaching programs
The hospital became a teaching hospital of University of Medicine 2, Yangon in 1993. It is also affiliated with University of Medical Technology, Yangon, University of Pharmacy, Yangon and University of Nursing, Yangon.

Undergraduate
 MBBS degree	
 Third MB
 Final part II 
 House surgeon
 Postgraduate
 M Med Sc (Internal Medicine)
 Dip Med Sc (Hospital Administration)
 Others
 Nursing training
 Pharmacist training
 Paramedical sciences (Radiology, physiotherapy and lab technicians)

See also
 List of hospitals in Yangon

References

Hospitals in Yangon
Hospitals established in 1930